Ascension Saint Thomas Hospital Midtown, formerly known as Baptist Hospital, is a non-profit community hospital in Nashville, Tennessee, United States and the largest such hospital in Middle Tennessee. It is licensed for 683 acute and rehab care beds.

Ascension Saint Thomas Hospital Midtown is operated by Ascension Health, which also operates Ascension Saint Thomas River Park Hospital in McMinnville, Saint Thomas - Rutherford Hospital in Murfreesboro, Saint Thomas Hickman Hospital in Centerville, Saint Thomas River Park Hospital in McMinnville, Saint Thomas Dekalb Hospital in Smithville, Saint Thomas Stones River Hospital in Woodbury, and Saint Thomas Highlands Hospital in Sparta.

History 

In 1918, an influenza epidemic ravaged Nashville and during this crisis Baptist Hospital was established. Originally known as Protestant Hospital, it was incorporated on December 12, 1918, by L. A Bowers, Leslie Creek, E. B. Craig, R. M. Dudley and John A. Pitts.

The 10-and-a-half-acre plot bought from the Murphy estate consisted of two adjoining city blocks, bounded by four city streets: Patterson Street on the north, Church Street on the south, 20th Avenue on the east, and 21st Avenue on the west. There were two buildings – one became the hospital and one became the dormitory for the School of Nursing.

On March 20, 1919, Protestant Hospital opened. It was equipped with 80 beds and a surgical department. In the first year alone, 2,233 patients were treated; 1,685 of them had major surgery. Gladys Kilby was the first patient admitted and gave birth to a baby girl, Anita Kilby Lewis.

Debt grew quickly during the Great Depression and during World War II. As a result of the ongoing financial difficulties, the ownership of Protestant Hospital was transferred to the Tennessee Baptist Convention in 1948 and became Mid-State Baptist Hospital. The name would later change to Baptist Hospital on December 17, 1964. By 1973, Baptist Hospital, with its 600 beds, had become the largest hospital in Midsouth. It purchased five buildings from Saint Thomas Hospital’s vacated Church Street property in 1975. In 1986, Baptist Hospital and Saint Thomas Hospital partnered to purchase Middle Tennessee Medical Center in Murfreesboro, Tennessee.

In January 2002, Baptist Hospital joined Saint Thomas Health's regional health system and became a member of Ascension Health, a Catholic organization that is the largest non-profit health system in the United States. In 2013, its name was changed from Baptist Hospital to Ascension Saint Thomas Hospital Midtown.

Spiritual Care Initiative 
A faith-based hospital, Ascension Saint Thomas Hospital Midtown encourages spiritual healing in addition to physical health. Hospital leaders developed "Creating a Healing Environment: Spiritual Care Initiative" in order to better integrate spirituality into the workplace. The concept takes a department-by-department approach to spiritual care.

Ascension Saint Thomas Hospital Midtown chaplains meet with a department manager to discuss the spiritual care initiative and select a committee of multidisciplinary staff members. Relying on input from colleagues, the team members develop ways spiritual care can enhance their department.

The hospital's neonatal intensive care unit has added a staff prayer to be said at shift change, a box where people can submit prayer requests, a prayer board in the break room, and an "inspiration station," a basket full of hand-outs on spiritual care as well as greeting cards that associates can give to one another and others.

Ascension Saint Thomas Heart 

A collaborative effort among its family of hospitals and other clinics and health care facilities throughout Middle Tennessee and Southern Kentucky, Saint Thomas Heart provides complete cardiac services from more than 20 locations.

In 2008, Saint Thomas Heart was ranked #1 in Tennessee for Coronary Interventional Procedures by HealthGrades. The hospitals of Saint Thomas Heart also received five-star ratings for the treatment of heart failure and atrial fibrillation, coronary interventional procedures and coronary services. Saint Thomas Heart was also ranked among the top 5% in the nation for coronary interventions and the top 10% in the nation for cardiology services.

Also in 2008, Thomson/Reuters named Saint Thomas Heart to its list of top 100 cardiovascular community hospitals.

In 2010, The cardiologists and heart surgeons at St Thomas West Hospital and Saint Thomas Midtown Hospital joined under the parent company Saint Thomas Heart. Both groups of physicians still practice separately at each hospital.

Chest Pain Network 
The Saint Thomas Chest Pain Network is a division of Saint Thomas Health that coordinates with local emergency medical services (EMS) and hospitals to provide cardiac care services. The Chest Pain Network includes 15 hospitals in Tennessee and Kentucky, all accredited by the Society of Chest Pain Centers.

Neurosciences Institute 
The Saint Thomas Health Neurosciences Institute is among the Nashville area's most comprehensive brain, back, nervous system, and spine centers. In 2008, independent healthcare rating company HealthGrades gave Saint Thomas a five-star rating for back and neck surgery.

Among the ailments and diseases treated through the Neurosciences Institute are stroke, brain tumors, ALS, sleep disorders, spine injuries, multiple sclerosis, chronic pain, and Parkinson's disease.

Saint Thomas Brain & Spine Tumor Center is a collaboration between the Neurosciences Institute and the Dan Rudy Cancer Center. Saint Thomas uses the Novalis Shaped Beam Surgery System, an advanced stereostatic radiotherapy treatment that focuses radiation to the shape of the tumor and results in minimum damage to surrounding tissue. The Saint Thomas Health Services Neurosciences Institute is the only health care center in Tennessee to provide Novalis Shaped Beam Surgery.

Metabolic Surgery Center 
The Metabolic Surgery Center at Saint Thomas Midtown Hospital provides a variety of weight loss procedures to assist in the treatment of morbid obesity, diabetes, high blood pressure, sleep apnea, arthritis, asthma, acid reflux, infertility and high cholesterol.

These bariatric procedures include the Laparoscopic Adjustable Gastric Band (LAP-BAND) System, Laparoscopic Roux-en-Y Gastric Bypass, Open or Laparoscopic Duodenal Switch and Laparoscopic Sleeve Gastrectomy.

Orthopedic Services 
Saint Thomas Midtown is home to the Joint Replacement Center, which was rated among the top 10 in Tennessee by HealthGrades for Joint Replacement.

In addition to joint replacement, other orthopedic services include sports medicine (including sports physicals), rehabilitation, spine care and surgery, foot and ankle care, and hand, wrist and shoulder care.

Sports Medicine 

A specialized extension of its orthopedic program, Baptist Sports Medicine combines several services under its umbrella, including general orthopedics, physical therapy, aquatic therapy, athletic medicine and occupational therapy. Baptist Sports Medicine is the exclusive health care provider to the Tennessee Titans, Tennessee Secondary School Athletic Association and Lipscomb University.

In 2007, Baptist Sports Medicine managing director Trent Nessler headed a research team to evaluate screening tests and evaluate their predictive value for athletic injury when used as a pre-assessment tool.

Baptist Sports Medicine clinics can be found throughout Middle Tennessee, with locations in downtown Nashville, Antioch, Bellevue, Brentwood, Centerville, Green Hills, Murfreesboro, Pleasant View, Rivergate and Spring Hill, as well as at Lipscomb University.

Life Therapies 

The Life Therapies offers specialized rehabilitation therapy services in a relaxed, non-hospital atmosphere. Because the recovery process can be an emotionally difficult experience, Life Therapies services are located in clinics that are designed as a comfortable environment conducive to healing.

Life Therapies clinics offer services for a variety of stages in a patient's life, including treatment of lymphedema, and neurological, post-stroke, vestibular, pediatric, oncology and women's health issues. The staff consists of licensed physical, occupational and speech therapists.

Until January 2009, the Life Therapies services were provided under the umbrella of Baptist Sports Medicine. It was determined that creating the new Life Therapies service line would allow therapists and physicians to better treat patients that don't require traditional sports medicine.

The six clinics are found throughout Middle Tennessee, including locations at Baptist Medical Plaza I in downtown Nashville, Green Hills, Maryland Farms YMCA in Brentwood, Spring Hill and two locations in Murfreesboro.

Center for Pelvic Health 

The Center for Pelvic Health is made up of a multidisciplinary team to diagnose and treat pelvic health disorders, focusing on chronic pain and incontinence. The center touts the use of unique treatments, such as non-surgical interventions (cystoscopy, urodynamics, colposcopy and tibial nerve stimulation), pelvic floor physical therapy (postural and pelvic floor muscle evaluation), and surgical treatment options (diagnostic laparoscopy, awake pain mapping, urethral slings and advanced robotic techniques).

The Center for Pelvic Health is a referral center and works with patients' primary care physicians for treatment.

Women's health 
The hospitals of Saint Thomas Health Services partner together to provide women's health services that range from gynecology and breast health to pelvic health and birthing services. St. Thomas – Midtown Hospital is also home to a level III neonatal intensive care unit.

Cancer program 
Saint Thomas Health Services provides treatment and prevention services for a number of forms of cancer, including brain, breast, cervical, colon, lung, ovarian, prostate, uterine and others.

As part of its treatment, the Saint Thomas Health Services Cancer Program partners with institutions, including Cleveland Clinic and Tennessee Oncology, to partake in community-based clinical trials in oncology and related therapies.

In December 2008, Baptist Hospital's cancer program was recognized by the Commission on Cancer of the American College of Surgeons as offering the best in cancer care. Baptist Hospital received Three-Year Approval with Commendation from the Commission on Cancer.

Critical care units 
There are three main intensive care units at St Thomas Midtown Hospital. The Medical ICU, Neuro-Surgical ICU, and the CVICU.

The Medical intensive care unit has 14 beds and treats a variety of critically ill patients. The Surgical intensive care unit also has 14 beds and treats Neurological and Surgical patients. The CVICU is a new unit developed in 2012 that sees the post Coronary Artery Bypass patients. A heart doctor from St Thomas Heart is always in the hospital 24 hours a day, 7 days a week.

In 2008, The Neuro ICU and the Surgical ICU combined beds and formed the current Neuro-Surgical ICU.

References

Further reading

Baptist Hospital, Nashville - Best Hospitals. U.S. News & World Report

External links

Hospital buildings completed in 1919
Hospitals established in 1918
Hospitals in Nashville, Tennessee
1918 establishments in Tennessee
Christian hospitals